William Corfield may refer to:

William Corfield (footballer), soccer player
William Henry Corfield (hygienist) (1843–1903), English hygienist
William Henry Corfield (politician) (1843–1927), Australian politician